Litoria ollauro is a species of frog in the subfamily Pelodryadinae, endemic to Papua New Guinea.
Its natural habitats are subtropical or tropical moist montane forests, freshwater marshes, intermittent freshwater marshes, and rural gardens.
It is threatened by habitat loss.

References

Litoria
Amphibians of Papua New Guinea
Amphibians described in 1993
Taxonomy articles created by Polbot